The 2017 AFC U-16 Women's Championship was the 7th edition of the AFC U-16 Women's Championship, the biennial international youth football championship organised by the Asian Football Confederation (AFC) for the women's under-16 national teams of Asia. The tournament was held in Thailand between 10 and 23 September 2017, with a total of eight teams competing.

The top three teams of the tournament qualified for the 2018 FIFA U-17 Women's World Cup in Uruguay as the AFC representatives.

Qualification

The draw for the qualifiers was held on 19 May 2016. Four teams qualified directly for the final tournament by their 2015 performance, while the other entrants competed in the qualifying stage for the remaining four spots (Thailand also participated in qualifying despite already qualified as hosts). The qualifiers were held from 25 August to 5 September 2016.

Qualified teams
The following eight teams qualified for the final tournament.

Venues
The tournament was held in Chonburi, Chonburi Province, at the Chonburi Stadium and the IPE Chonburi Stadium.

Draw
The draw was held on 28 April 2017, 15:00 MYT (UTC+8), at the AFC House in Kuala Lumpur, Malaysia. The eight teams were drawn into two groups of four teams. The teams were seeded according to their performance in the 2015 AFC U-16 Women's Championship final tournament and qualification, with the hosts Thailand automatically seeded and assigned to Position A1 in the draw.

Squads

Players born between 1 January 2001 and 31 December 2003 are eligible to compete in the tournament. Each team must register a squad of minimum 16 players and maximum 23 players, minimum two of whom must be goalkeepers (Regulations Articles 29.4 and 29.5).

Group stage
The top two teams of each group advance to the semi-finals.

Tiebreakers
Teams are ranked according to points (3 points for a win, 1 point for a draw, 0 points for a loss), and if tied on points, the following tiebreaking criteria are applied, in the order given, to determine the rankings (Regulations Article 11.5):
Points in head-to-head matches among tied teams;
Goal difference in head-to-head matches among tied teams;
Goals scored in head-to-head matches among tied teams;
If more than two teams are tied, and after applying all head-to-head criteria above, a subset of teams are still tied, all head-to-head criteria above are reapplied exclusively to this subset of teams;
Goal difference in all group matches;
Goals scored in all group matches;
Penalty shoot-out if only two teams are tied and they met in the last round of the group;
Disciplinary points (yellow card = 1 point, red card as a result of two yellow cards = 3 points, direct red card = 3 points, yellow card followed by direct red card = 4 points);
Drawing of lots.

All times are local, ICT (UTC+7).

Group A

Group B

Knockout stage
In the knockout stage, penalty shoot-out (no extra time) is used to decide the winner if necessary.

Bracket

Semi-finals
Winners qualified for 2018 FIFA U-17 Women's World Cup.

Third place match
Winner qualified for 2018 FIFA U-17 Women's World Cup.

Final

Winners

Qualified teams for FIFA U-17 Women's World Cup
The following three teams from AFC qualified for the 2018 FIFA U-17 Women's World Cup.

1 Bold indicates champions for that year. Italic indicates hosts for that year.

Awards
The following awards were given at the conclusion of the tournament.

Goalscorers
9 goals

 Kim Kyong-yong

5 goals

 Ri Su-gyong
 Cho Mi-jin

4 goals

 Tang Han
 Zhang Linyan
 Tomoko Tanaka

3 goals

 Ko Min-jung

2 goals

 Momoka Kinoshita
 Yuzuki Yamamoto
 Yun Ji-hwa
 Pluemjai Sontisawat

1 goal

 Kyra Cooney-Cross
 Laura Hughes
 Sofia Sakalis
 Monika Chakma
 Shamsunnahar
 Han Huimin
 Jin Jing
 Li Yinghua
 Ou Yiyao
 Wang Yumeng
 Yang Qian
 Moe Nakae
 Momo Nakao
 Haruka Osawa
 Chihiro Tomioka
 Kim Yun-ok
 Ko Kyong-hui
 Pak Hye-gyong
 Ri Su-jong
 An Se-bin
 Chang Eun-hyun
 Hwang Ah-hyeon
 Kim Bit-na
 Lee Su-in
 Panittha Jeeratanapavibul
 Ploychompoo Somnonk

1 own goal

 Wararat Nanongtum (against China)

References

External links
, the-AFC.com
AFC U-16 Women's Championship 2017, stats.the-AFC.com

 
2017
U-16 Women's Championship
2017 in women's association football
2017 in youth association football
2017 in Thai football
2017 AFC U-16 Women's Championship
Sport in Chonburi province
September 2017 sports events in Thailand